Anduramba is a rural locality in the Toowoomba Region, Queensland, Australia.

Geography 
The northeast of the locality is marked by Emu Creek, a tributary of the Brisbane River.

History 
Anduramba State School opened in 1912. It closed in 1952 but re-opened in 1953. It closed permanently on 18 October 1959. The school was in McGreevy Road.

Anduramba was officially named and bounded as a locality in February 1999. The boundaries were amended in September 2005 to include the locality of Nudindenda.

References

Toowoomba Region
Localities in Queensland